Juan Manuel Rodríguez Rubio (born 19 October 1968), also known as Juan Rubio, is a Chilean former professional footballer who played as a defensive midfielder for clubs in Chile and Indonesia.

Career
Born in Santiago, Rodríguez Rubio is a product of both Colo-Colo and Coquimbo Unido youth systems. He made his professional debut with Coquimbo Unido when his father, Juan Sr., was the coach. 

In Chile, he also played for Deportes Valdivia, Santiago Wanderers, Municipal Talagante and Deportes Melipilla at all divisions, before moving to Indonesia.

In 1995, he joined Persma Manado and switched to Arema Malang in 1996, staying with the club until 2000, with a stint in Singapore playing for Gombak United in 1998–99. In Persma Manado he coincided with his compatriots Rodrigo Araya and Nelson León Sánchez. In Arema Malang he coincided with Araya and León Sánchez again, in addition to his younger brother, Francisco, and Julio César Moreno.

He is noted for introducing the song Vamos Leones (Let's go Lions), sung by fans of Universidad de Chile, to Arema Malang fans who changed the words to Come on, come on Arema. The song later spread across Indonesia with the lyrics being changed to suit their respective clubs by Indonesian football fans.

He after played for PSDS Deli Serdang, Gelora Putra Delta and Persikab Bandung.

Personal life
Juan and his younger brother, Francisco or Paco, who also played in Indonesian football, are the sons of the former Chile international footballer Juan Rodríguez Vega and the nephews of the also former footballers Manuel and Gabriel Rodríguez Vega.

References

External links
 Juan Rodríguez Rubio at WeAremania.net 
 Juan Rodríguez Rubio at MemoriaWanderers.cl 
 

1968 births
Living people
Footballers from Santiago
Chilean footballers
Chilean expatriate footballers
Coquimbo Unido footballers
Deportes Valdivia footballers
Santiago Wanderers footballers
Deportes Melipilla footballers
Persma Manado players
Arema F.C. players
Gombak United FC players
PSDS Deli Serdang players
Deltras F.C. players
Persikab Bandung players
Primera B de Chile players
Chilean Primera División players
Tercera División de Chile players
Indonesian Premier Division players
Singapore Premier League players
Chilean expatriate sportspeople in Indonesia
Chilean expatriate sportspeople in Singapore
Expatriate footballers in Indonesia
Expatriate footballers in Singapore
Association football midfielders